Boris Valentinovich Isachenko (born 26 December 1958) is a retired Belarusian archer who competed for the Soviet Union. He won individual silver medals at the 1980 Olympics and 1983 European Championships, but never won a Soviet title or a medal at world championships. Besides competitions he acted as a sports official with the Soviet State Committee for Physical Culture and Sports (1979–91) and Belarus Ministry of Sports (1991–97). In 1997–99 he headed the Robin Hood Archery Club. He is a member of the Belarusian Archery Federation, and since 1998 trained the Belarusian archery team. Since 2002 he is also a member of the Belarusian Olympic Committee.

References

1958 births
Living people
Belarusian male archers
Soviet male archers
Olympic archers of the Soviet Union
Olympic silver medalists for the Soviet Union
Archers at the 1980 Summer Olympics
Olympic medalists in archery
Medalists at the 1980 Summer Olympics
Sportspeople from Brest, Belarus